Dongsheng Subdistrict is a subdistrict of Erdao District, Changchun, People's Republic of China, located east of the Yitong River. , it has 6 residential communities under its administration.

See also 
 List of township-level divisions of Jilin

References 

Township-level divisions of Jilin
Changchun